The 2010 Elon Phoenix football team represented Elon University in the 2010 NCAA Division I FCS football season. The Phoenix were led by fifth-year head coach Pete Lembo and played their home games at Rhodes Stadium. They played as member of the Southern Conference. They finished the season 6–5, 5–3 in SoCon play to finish in a tie for third place.

Schedule

References

Elon
Elon Phoenix football seasons
Elon PHoenix football